Dann is an English surname. It is a toponymic surname which came from Middle English  and Old English , "valley". Variant spellings include Dan and Dane.

According to statistics compiled by Patrick Hanks on the basis of the 2011 United Kingdom census and the Census of Ireland 2011, 2,666 people on the island of Great Britain and 54 on the island of Ireland bore the surname Dann as of 2011. In the 1881 United Kingdom census there had been 1,858 people with the surname Dann, primarily at Kent, Sussex, London, and Norfolk. The 2010 United States Census found 3,735 people with the surname Dann, making it the 8,775th-most-common name in the country. This represented a decrease from 4,062 (7,550th most-common) in the 2000 Census. In both censuses, nearly nine-tenths of the bearers of the surname identified as non-Hispanic white, and about six percent as non-Hispanic Black or African American.

People with this surname include:

Artists and musicians
 Hollis Dann (1861–1939), American music educator and choral director
 Stan Dann (1931–2008), American wood carver
 Georgie Dann (1940–2021), French singer
 Larry Dann (born 1941), British film and television actor
 Steven Dann (born 1953), Canadian violist
 Penny Dann (1964–2014), British children's book illustrator 
 Sophie-Louise Dann (born 1969), British musical theatre actress
 Lance Dann, British sound and radio artist

Sportspeople
 Reg Dann (1916–1948), English football midfielder
 Gordon Dann (born 1944), Australian rules footballer
 Donald Dann (1949–2005), Australian Paralympic athlete and table tennis player
 Kevin Dann (1958–2021), Australian rugby league footballer
 Scott Dann (boxer) (born 1974), English amateur boxer
 Scott Dann (born 1987), English football centre-back
 Thomas Dann (born 1981), English cricketer
 Walter Dann, Canadian Paralympic athlete

Writers
 George Landen Dann (1904–1977), Australian playwright, writer, and draftsman
 Colin Dann (born 1943), British writer of children's books
 Jack Dann (born 1945) American science fiction writer
 Trevor Dann (born 1951), British writer and broadcaster
 Patty Dann (born 1953), American novelist and nonfiction writer

Others
 Christian Adam Dann (1758–1837), German Lutheran pastor
 Wallace Dann (1847–1934), American local politician in Norwalk, Connecticut
 Alf Dann (1893–1953), British trade union leader
 Belinda Dann (1900–2007), Indigenous Australian woman known as a member of the Stolen Generation
 Bob Dann (1914–2008), Anglican Archbishop of Melbourne, Australia
 Michael Dann (1921–2016), American television executive
 Mary Dann and Carrie Dann (respectively 1923–2005 and 1931–2021), Native American activists
 Laurie Dann (1957–1988), American murderer
 Marc Dann (born 1962), American politician
 Tim Dann, British voice actor

See also
 Dan (disambiguation)
 Danu (disambiguation)
 Wimm-Bill-Dann Foods, a Russian food producer

References

English-language surnames